William Woodard Self (born 26 September 1961) is an English author, journalist, political commentator and broadcaster. He has written 11 novels, five collections of shorter fiction, three novellas and nine collections of non-fiction writing. Self is currently Professor of Modern Thought at Brunel University London, where he teaches psychogeography.

His 2002 novel Dorian, an Imitation was longlisted for the Booker Prize, and his 2012 novel Umbrella was shortlisted. His fiction is known for being satirical, grotesque and fantastical, and is predominantly set within his home city of London. His writing often explores mental illness, drug abuse and psychiatry.

Self is a regular contributor to publications including The Guardian, Harper's Magazine, The New York Times and the London Review of Books. He currently writes a column for the New Statesman, and he has been a columnist for the Observer, The Times, and the Evening Standard. His columns for Building Design on the built environment, and for the Independent Magazine on the psychology of place brought him to prominence as a thinker concerned with the politics of urbanism.

Self is a regular contributor to British television, initially as a guest on comic panel shows such as Have I Got News for You. In 2002, Self replaced Mark Lamarr on the BBC comedy panel show Shooting Stars  for two series, but was himself replaced by comedian Jack Dee when the programme returned in 2008.  He has since appeared on current affairs programmes such as Newsnight and Question Time. Self is a contributor to the BBC Radio 4 programme A Point of View, to which he contributes radio essays delivered in his familiar "lugubrious tones". In 2013, Self took part in discussions about becoming the inaugural BBC Radio 4 Writer-in-Residence, but later withdrew.

Early life
Self was born in London and brought up in north London, between the suburbs of East Finchley and Hampstead Garden Suburb. His parents were Peter John Otter Self, Professor of Public Administration at the London School of Economics, and Elaine Rosenbloom, from Queens, New York, who worked as a publisher's assistant. His paternal grandfather was Sir Albert Henry Self. Self spent a year living in Ithaca in upstate New York.

Self's parents separated when he was nine, and divorced when he was 18. Despite the intellectual encouragement given by his parents, he was an emotionally confused and self-destructive child, harming himself with cigarette ends and knives before beginning to experiment with drugs.

Self was a voracious reader from a young age. When he was 10, he developed an interest in works of science fiction such as Frank Herbert's Dune and the works of J. G. Ballard and Philip K. Dick. Into his teenage years, Self claimed to have been "overawed by the canon", which stifled his ability to express himself. Self's use of drugs increased in step with his prolific reading. He started smoking cannabis at the age of 12, progressing by way of amphetamines, cocaine and LSD to heroin, which he started injecting at 18. Self struggled with mental health issues during this period, and aged 20 became a hospital outpatient.

Self attended University College School, an independent school for boys in Hampstead. He later attended Christ's College, Finchley, from where he went to Exeter College, Oxford, reading Philosophy, Politics and Economics and graduated with a third class degree. At Oxford, he was editor of and frequent contributor to an underground left-wing student newspaper called Red Herring/Oxford Strumpet, copies of which are archived in the Bodleian Library.

Career

After graduating from Oxford, Self worked for the Greater London Council, including as a road sweeper, whilst residing in Brixton. He pursued a career as a cartoonist for the New Statesman and other publications and as a stand-up comedian. He moved to Gloucester Road around 1985. In 1986 he entered a treatment centre in Weston-super-Mare, where he claimed that his heroin addiction was cured. In 1989, "through a series of accidents", he "blagged" his way into running a small publishing company.

The publication of his short story collection The Quantity Theory of Insanity brought him to public attention in 1991. Self was hailed as an original new talent by Salman Rushdie, Doris Lessing, Beryl Bainbridge, A. S. Byatt and Bill Buford. In 1993 he was nominated by Granta magazine as one of the 20 "Best Young British Novelists". Conversely, Self's second book, My Idea of Fun, was "mauled" by the critics.

Self joined the Observer as a columnist in 1995. He gained negative publicity in 1997 when he was sent to cover the election campaign of John Major and was caught by a rival journalist using heroin on the Prime Minister's jet; he was fired as a result. At the time, he argued "I'm a hack who gets hired because I do drugs". He joined the Times as a columnist in 1997. In 1999 he left the Times to join the Independent on Sunday, which he left in 2002 for the Evening Standard.

He has made many appearances on British television, especially as a panellist on Have I Got News for You and as a regular on Shooting Stars. Since 2008 Self has appeared five times on Question Time. He stopped appearing in Have I Got News for You, stating the show had become a pseudo-panel show. Between 2003 and 2006 he was a regular contributor to the BBC2 television series Grumpy Old Men.

Since 2009, Self has written two alternating fortnightly columns for the New Statesman. The Madness of Crowds explores social phenomena and group behaviour, and in Real Meals he reviews high street food outlets. For a May 2014 article in The Guardian, he wrote: "the literary novel as an art work and a narrative art form central to our culture is indeed dying before our eyes", explaining in a July 2014 article that his royalty income had decreased "dramatically" over the previous decade. The July article followed the release of a study of the earnings of British authors that was commissioned by the Authors' Licensing and Collecting Society.

Self is a professor of Modern Thought at Brunel University London. He was appointed in 2012.

Literary style

According to M. Hunter Hayes, Self has given his reason for writing as follows: "I don't write fiction for people to identify with and I don't write a picture of the world they can recognise. I write to astonish people." "What excites me is to disturb the reader's fundamental assumptions. I want to make them feel that certain categories within which they are used to perceiving the world are unstable."

When he was ten, he developed an interest in works of science fiction such as Frank Herbert's Dune and those of J. G. Ballard and Philip K. Dick. Self admires the work of J. G. Ballard, Alasdair Gray and Martin Amis. He has said that he previously admired William Burroughs but went off him. He has cited influences such as Jonathan Swift, Franz Kafka, Lewis Carroll and Joseph Heller as formative influences on his writing style. Other influences on his fiction include Hunter S. Thompson. Self credits Céline's book Journey to the End of the Night with inspiring him to write fiction.

Zack Busner is a recurring character in Self's fiction, appearing in the short story collections The Quantity Theory of Insanity, Grey Area and Dr. Mukti and Other Tales of Woe, as well as in the novels Great Apes, The Book of Dave, Umbrella and Shark. Busner is a psychiatrist and psychoanalyst practising in London, and is prone to self-promotion at the expense of his patients. He is often the antagonist of the stories he appears in, although not always with villainous intent.

Among Self's admirers was the American critic Harold Bloom. Journalist Stuart Maconie has described him as "that rarity in modern cultural life, a genuine intellectual with a bracing command of words and ideas who is also droll, likeable and culturally savvy."

Political views
In the 2015 UK general election Self voted Labour in a general election for the first time since 1997. In May 2015, he wrote in The Guardian: "No, I'm no longer a socialist if to be one is to believe that a socialist utopia is attainable by some collective feat of will – but I remain a socialist, if 'socialism' is to be understood as an antipathy to vested interests and privileges neither deserved nor earned, and a strong desire for a genuinely egalitarian society." In March 2017, he wrote in the New Statesman: "Nowadays I think in terms of compassionate pragmatism: I'll leave socialism to Žižek and the other bloviators."

In July 2015 Self endorsed Jeremy Corbyn's campaign in the Labour Party leadership election. He said during a Channel 4 News interview that Corbyn represents a useful ideological divide within Labour, and could lead to the formation of a schism in the party.

Self is a republican.

Personal life
Self's mother died in 1988. He was married from 1989 to 1997 to Kate Chancellor. They have two children, a son, Alexis, and a daughter, Madeleine. They lived together in a terraced house just off the Portobello Road. In 1997, Self married journalist Deborah Orr, with whom he has sons Ivan and Luther. In 2017, Orr and Self separated, and Self was living in a rented flat in Stockwell. Orr died on 20 October 2019.

Self has stated that he has abstained from drugs, except for caffeine and nicotine, since 1998. He sent his younger children to private schools after they experienced bullying at state schools in Lambeth.

Self was diagnosed with the blood disease Polycythaemia vera in 2011.

He has described himself as a psychogeographer and modern flâneur, and has written about walks he has taken. In December 2006, he walked  from his home in South London to Heathrow Airport. Upon arriving at Kennedy Airport he walked  from there to Manhattan. In August 2013, Self wrote of his anger following an incident in which he was stopped and questioned by police in Yorkshire while out walking with his 11-year-old son, on suspicion of being a paedophile. The police were alerted by a security guard at Bishop Burton College. He had asked the security guard for permission to cross the school grounds.

In September 2018 Self was accused of "mental cruelty" by Orr in relation to their divorce, in a series of posts on Twitter.

Self has discussed his Jewish heritage and its impact on his identity. In 2006, Self  'resigned' as a Jew as a protest against the Israeli invasion of Lebanon. In 2018 he stated in an interview with the BBC that he had rethought his position, due to the resurgence of anti-Semitism in Britain.

His brother is the author and journalist Jonathan Self.

Self became a vegetarian in 2019.

Legacy 
In 2016, the British Library acquired Self's archive; the collection is a hybrid archive of paper and born-digital material. The Papers of Will Self are divided into two parts: family papers and personal and literary papers. The papers can be accessed through the British Library catalogue.

Awards
 1991: Geoffrey Faber Memorial Prize for The Quantity Theory of Insanity
 1998: Aga Khan Prize for Fiction from The Paris Review for Tough Tough Toys for Tough Tough Boys
 2008: Bollinger Everyman Wodehouse Prize for Comic Fiction for The Butt

Works

Novels
 Cock and Bull (1992)
 My Idea of Fun (1993)
 The Sweet Smell of Psychosis (illustrated novella) (1996)
 Great Apes (1997)
 How the Dead Live (2000)
 Dorian, an Imitation (2002)
 The Book of Dave (2006)
 The Butt (2008)
 Walking to Hollywood (2010)
 Umbrella (2012)
 Shark (2014)
 Phone (2017)

Short story collections
 The Quantity Theory of Insanity (1991)
 Grey Area (1994)
 Tough, Tough Toys for Tough, Tough Boys (1998)
 Dr. Mukti and Other Tales of Woe (2004)
 Liver: A Fictional Organ with a Surface Anatomy of Four Lobes (2008)
 The Undivided Self: Selected Stories (2010)

Non-fiction
Self has also compiled several books of work from his newspaper and magazine columns which mix interviews with counter-culture figures, restaurant reviews and literary criticism.
 Junk Mail (1996)
 Perfidious Man (2000) photography by David M. Gamble
 Sore Sites (2000)
 Feeding Frenzy (2001)
 Psychogeography (2007)
 Psycho Too (2009)
 The Unbearable Lightness of Being a Prawn Cracker (2012)
 Will (2019)
 Why Read: Selected Writings 2001-2021 (2022)

Television
 The Minor Character – Self's short story was turned into a short film on Sky Arts which starred David Tennant as "Will".

References

External links

 
 
 
 
 Will Self article on why he writes in The Guardian
 "The Principle", short fiction by Will Self
 Will Self profile from the New Statesman
 Will Self author page at Guardian Books
 Will Self short interview at the BBC
 Will Self audio interview at Salon
'The Lives of Typewriters and Large Data-sets: The Will Self Archive' British Library English and Drama Blog

1961 births
Living people
20th-century English novelists
21st-century English novelists
Alumni of Exeter College, Oxford
English male journalists
English people of American descent
English people of Jewish descent
English republicans
English satirists
English short story writers
English socialists
English male novelists
English male short story writers
People educated at University College School
People from East Finchley
Postmodern writers
Psychogeographers
20th-century English male writers
21st-century English male writers
People educated at Christ's College, Finchley
Will